The World Fantasy Awards are given each year by the World Fantasy Convention for the best fantasy fiction and fantasy art published in English during the preceding calendar year. The awards have been described by sources such as The Guardian as a "prestigious fantasy prize", and as one of the three most renowned speculative fiction awards, along with the Hugo and Nebula Awards (which cover both fantasy and science fiction). The World Fantasy Award—Life Achievement is given each year to individuals for their overall career in fields related to fantasy. These have included, for example, authors, editors, and publishers. The specific nomination reasons are not given, and nominees are not required to have retired, though they can only win once. The Life Achievement category has been awarded annually since 1975.

World Fantasy Award nominees are decided by attendees and judges at the annual World Fantasy Convention. A ballot is posted in June for attendees of the current and previous two conferences to determine two of the finalists, and a panel of five judges adds three or more nominees before voting on the overall winner of each category. Unlike the other World Fantasy Award categories, the nominees for the Life Achievement award are not announced; instead, the winner is announced along with the nominees in the other categories. The panel of judges is typically made up of fantasy authors, and is chosen each year by the World Fantasy Awards Administration, which has the power to break ties. The final results are presented at the World Fantasy Convention at the end of October. Through 2015, winners were presented with a statuette of H. P. Lovecraft; more recent winners receive a statuette of a tree.

During the 47 nomination years, 75 people have been given the Life Achievement Award. Multiple winners have been awarded 24 times, typically two co-winners, though five were noted in 1984. Since 2000, it has become an unofficial tradition for two winners to be announced, often with one winner primarily an author and the other not. While most winners have been authors and editors, five winners have been primarily artists of fantasy art and book covers, and four winners are best known for founding or running publishing houses that produce fantasy works.

Winners
In the following table, the years correspond to the date of the ceremony. Items in the Work(s) column are items and companies that the winner created or worked at; they are meant to be representative of the winner's career in the field of fantasy to that point, but the World Fantasy Award for Life Achievement is not given for any specific achievement, and no such achievements are listed by the World Fantasy Convention as reasons for the award. In many cases the winner is well known for their non-fantasy works, such as science fiction novels, which are not listed.

Notes

References

External links
 World Fantasy Convention official site

Life Achievement
Literary awards honoring lifetime achievement